The Surprise is a 2015 Dutch comedy film directed by Mike van Diem.

The story concerns a middle-aged man who, following the death of his wealthy mother, enlists the services of an illegal assisted-suicide firm in ending his life.

Cast
Jeroen van Koningsbrugge as Jacob van Zuylen de With
Georgina Verbaan as Anne de Koning
Jan Decleir as Cornald Muller
Henry Goodman as Mr. Jones
Ankur Bahl as Asif
Naveed Choudhry as Moshin
Oliver Gatz as Halim
Ronny Jhutti as Khuram
Elisabeth Andersen as Mother
 as Marissa de la Rue
Michiel Blankwaardt as Truckdriver
Pierre Bokma as Security Van Zuylen Foundation
Judith Edixhoven as Assistant De Wijs
 as De Wijs
Esther von Arx as Juljia Barsukova

Reception
On review aggregator website Rotten Tomatoes, The Surprise has an approval rating of 88% based on 8 reviews, with an average rating of 6.80/10.

References

External links

2015 comedy films
Dutch comedy films
Films directed by Mike van Diem
Films about suicide